Steve Anderhub (born 12 July 1970) is a Swiss bobsledder who competed in the late 1990s and early 2000s. He won a silver medal in the two-man event with teammate Christian Reich at the 2002 Winter Olympics in Salt Lake City.

Anderhub also won a bronze medal in the four-man event at the 2001 FIBT World Championships in St. Moritz.

References
 Bobsleigh two-man Olympic medalists 1932-56 and since 1964
 Bobsleigh four-man world championship medalists since 1930
 DatabaseOlympics.com profile

1970 births
Bobsledders at the 1998 Winter Olympics
Bobsledders at the 2002 Winter Olympics
Living people
Olympic silver medalists for Switzerland
Olympic bobsledders of Switzerland
Swiss male bobsledders
Olympic medalists in bobsleigh
Medalists at the 2002 Winter Olympics
20th-century Swiss people
21st-century Swiss people